Shahbulag Castle (literally "Spring of the Shah") is an 18th-century fortress near Aghdam in Azerbaijan built by the Karabakh Khan Panah Ali.

Name and Etymology
The castle was named Shahbulag ("Shah's spring") after a nearby spring bearing the same name located around the lower part of the Xaçınçay (Khachen) River. Before the construction of the castle, the area around it was known as Tarnagyut, which, according to Armenian archaeologist Hamlet Petrosyan, is a corruption of Tigranakert, the ruined ancient city which lies nearby the castle.

History
After the death of Iranian ruler Nadir Shah, the Caucasus territory was split into several khanates, one of which was the Karabakh Khanate founded by Panah Ali Khan Javanshir. The first capital of the khanate was the Bayat Castle built in 1748. The capital was soon moved to the newly constructed Shahbulag Castle located in lowland Karabakh. Eventually, Panah Ali Khan moved the capital to its final location, Shusha, a natural fortress located on a hardly penetratable mountain rock. Once construction of Shusha castle was completed, Panah Ali Khan relocated there with all of his court, nobles, and meliks. Nevertheless, the khans of Karabakh kept about 3,000 strong horse cavalry in Shahbulag Castle at all times for defense purposes. The designs of Shahbulag, Shusha and Askeran castles resemble each other.

Castle
The castle was called Shahbulag ("Shah's spring") honouring the nearby spring. The complex which included mosques, houses, baths and a market was built in 1751–52. During the construction, limestone and dimension stone were used. Only the castle itself and the mosque on its northwestern end survived. The castle has a rectangular architectural design, and its external walls are reinforced with circular and semicylinder towers. The walls and towers contain embrasures and merlons typical for defence structures. The entrance to the castle is in the middle section of the eastern wall. During the reign of the khan, it was protected by two-story tower-like premises. The top floor was intended for the khan, with a stone staircase leading to it from the castle yard. The castle was built from half-hewn whole stones.

Mosque
The mosque built during the construction of Shahbulag castle is on the northwestern part of the castle. It includes a small stone prayer hall with a square dome  on one side and a veranda with a facade of  that faces east. The veranda beams are based on quadrangular 8-edge pillars. The architecture of Shahbulag is thought to have influenced later architectural designs of buildings in the entire Karabakh region, and especially that of Shusha.

Current state
Today, Shahbulag castle remains an important historic and cultural remnant of the Karabakh Khanate period. The castle was renovated in early 1980s by Azerbaijan SSR. During the First Nagorno-Karabakh war, the castle and its surroundings were captured by Armenian forces following the Battle of Aghdam. When the castle was under Armenian control, a small museum was operated there, storing artifacts found during excavations at the adjacent archaeological site of Tigranakert.

The castle and the Agdam District were returned to Azerbaijan on 20 November 2020 per the 2020 Nagorno-Karabakh ceasefire agreement following the 2020 Nagorno-Karabakh war. The artifacts from Tigranakert kept at Shahbulag were removed before the area was returned to Azerbaijani control.

Gallery

See also

Bayat Castle
Lekh Castle

References

Houses completed in 1752
Monuments and memorials in Azerbaijan
Palaces in Azerbaijan
Tourist attractions in Azerbaijan
Royal residences in Azerbaijan
Islamic architecture
Architecture in Azerbaijan
Castles and fortresses in Azerbaijan